Evans Mensah may refer to:

Evans Mensah (footballer, born 1988), Ghanaian former football striker
Evans Mensah (footballer, born 1998), Ghanaian football winger for Helsingin Jalkapalloklubi and Ghana national football team